Bellydance Superstars is a professional American bellydance troupe formed in 2002 by producer and manager Miles Copeland. In its first six years of touring, it presented 700 shows in 22 countries.

The line-up of performers has become increasingly diverse throughout the years and the repertoire incorporates elements of many different dance styles including traditional Egyptian bellydance, Turkish bellydance, American Tribal Style and Tribal Fusion. The troupe tours extensively in North America, Europe, and Asia.

Tours
The Bellydance Superstars, sometimes called BDSS, first toured in conjunction with the Lollapalooza 2003 music festival. Since then, the troupe has completed several full circuits of the world, infusing new cultural dance styles into the shows along the way.

"Bombay Bellywood" is their 75-stop tour that spanned the United States starting in October 2010. Several of the dancers learned some classical Indian dance for this trip.

Critical reception
The Bellydance Superstars have been described as "poised to be the next Riverdance." An academic study also compares the two companies, discussing their transformation of dance tradition into stage spectacle.

Media
In addition to live performances, the Bellydance Superstars company has produced instructional and performance DVDs with every level of learner in mind as well as a series of CDs featuring songs from their performances. Some of the dancers have created compilations of their personal favorites, such as Kami Liddle’s Tribal Beats for the Strange and Beautiful.

The company filmed a feature documentary called American Bellydancer. Several of the shows have been broadcast on national television in the USA, Latin America and Canada. The Bellydance Superstars Live in Paris show aired extensively on US public television station PBS.

References

External links
Bellydance Superstars website (as retrieved by the Wayback Machine on 12 March 2018)
The Times (UK) interview with Miles Copeland about the Bellydance Superstars by Andrew Billen. "My new tool for world domination: Riverdance ...with bare midriffs." 
 (In French.)

Belly dance
2002 establishments in California
Dance companies